Hypertension in Pregnancy is a quarterly peer-reviewed medical journal covering human and animal hypertension during gestation, including the physiology of circulatory control, pathophysiology, methodology, and therapy. It is published by Informa and the editors-in-chief are Peter von Dadelszen (Canada) and Fiona Lyall (Scotland). According to the Journal Citation Reports, the journal has a 2013 impact factor of 1.192.

References

External links 
 

English-language journals
Hypertension journals
Obstetrics and gynaecology journals
Publications established in 1982
Quarterly journals
Taylor & Francis academic journals